Malcolm Fisher McKenzie Bogie (born 26 December 1939) was a Scottish professional footballer, who played as an inside forward.

References

1939 births
Footballers from Edinburgh
Scottish footballers
Association football inside forwards
Hibernian F.C. players
Grimsby Town F.C. players
Aldershot F.C. players
English Football League players
Living people
Stirling Albion F.C. players
Scottish Football League players
Gala Fairydean Rovers F.C. players
Hawick Royal Albert F.C. players